Canadian singer and songwriter Deborah Cox has released ten albums (including five studio albums, three compilation albums, one remix album, and one extended play), and more than three dozen singles (including seven as a featured artist). She began her career in 1994 as a protégé of music executive Clive Davis, who signed her with Arista Records. Her self-titled debut album, a blend of R&B, soul and hip hop soul, was released in September 1995 and peaked at number 25 on the US Billboard Top R&B/Hip-Hop Albums. A steady seller, 
it was eventually certified gold by the Recording Industry Association of America (RIAA) for sales of over 500,000 units, and earned Cox a Juno Award for Best R&B/Soul Recording at the 1996 Juno Awards. Lead single "Sentimental" became a top thirty success on the US Billboard Hot 100, while second single "Who Do U Love" fared even better on the charts, peaking at number 17 on the Hot 100, while becoming her first number-one hit on Billboards Hot Dance Club Songs.

Albums

Studio albums

EPs

Soundtrack albums

Remix albums

Compilation albums

Singles

Featured singles

Notes

References

Discography
Discographies of Canadian artists
Soul music discographies